Do or Die is the second studio album by American New York-based rapper Tim Dog. It was released in 1993 via Ruffhouse/Columbia, and produced entirely by Tim Dog. The album represented Tim's shift of focus, away from confrontation with the West Coast and concentrated on hardcore East Coast rap. The album contained a shout-out to Tupac Shakur whom Tim thanked for assisting him when involved in a potentially violent situation when touring in California.

The album peaked at number 53 on the Top R&B/Hip-Hop Albums and number 17 on the Heatseekers Albums, spawning a single "I Get Wrecked" with KRS-One, which peaked at number 8 on the Hot Rap Songs.

Track listing

Personnel 

 Timothy Blair – main artist, producer
 Lawrence Parker – featured artist (track 3)
 Darryl Barnes – featured artist (track 8)
 Maurice Mo' Gallegos – co-producer (track 2)
 Ray Cortez – co-producer (track 2)
 Joseph Anthony Hernandez – co-producer (track 2)
 Maurice Russell Smith – drum programming & co-producer (track 3)
 Trevor Randolph – drum programming & co-producer (track 3)
 Shams – drum programming all beats
 Keith Matthew Thornton – bass & keyboards (track 3)
 Phil Nowlan – bass (track 4)
 Andy "Funky Drummer" Kravitz – drums (track 4)
 Mike Tyler – guitar (track 4)
 Jay Davidson – saxophone (track 5)
 Joseph Mario Nicolo – mixing (tracks: 1, 3-11), additional recording
 Craig Caruth – mixing (tracks: 2, 12), additional recording
 Daymon Warren – mixing (tracks: 2, 12)
 Leo "Swift" Morris – recording
 David Sussman – additional recording
 Kennan Keating – additional recording
 Steve Reece – additional recording
 Tony Dawsey – mastering
Diane Zaiko – assistant engineering
Dirk Grobelny – assistant engineering
Manuel Lecuona – assistant engineering
Francesca Restrepo – art direction & design
Gerhard Yurkovic – photography

Charts

References

External links

1993 albums
Tim Dog albums
Columbia Records albums
Ruffhouse Records albums
Albums recorded at Chung King Studios